Timothy D. Hawkes is an American attorney, lobbyist and politician serving as a member of the Utah House of Representatives from the 18th district. Elected in November 2014, he assumed office on January 1, 2015.

Education 
Hawkes earned a Bachelor of Arts degree in political science from Brigham Young University and a Juris Doctor from Columbia Law School.

Career 

Hawkes works as a Public Interest Lawyer. He also works as the state director for Trout Unlimited. He was first elected to the Utah House of Representatives in 2014 and began serving on January 1, 2015.

Currently his legislative career, Hawkes serves as the House Rules Chair. He serves on the House Natural Resources, Agriculture, and Environment Committee, House Business and Labor Committee, House Rules Committee, Natural Resources, and the Agriculture, and Environmental Quality Appropriations Subcommittee. Since 2019, Hawkes has served as chair of the House Rules Committee.

He has expressed concern about the potential for the Great Salt Lake to dry up, comparing the effect to California's Owens Lake.

Current legislation 

In 2022, Hawkes announced that he would be retiring from the legislature after his fourth consecutive term.

Personal life 
Hawkes lives in Centerville, Utah with his wife, Rebecca, and their four children.

References 

Republican Party members of the Utah House of Representatives
Living people
Brigham Young University alumni
Columbia Law School alumni
21st-century American politicians
People from Centerville, Utah
Year of birth missing (living people)
Utah lawyers
American lobbyists